Galactose is the self-released debut EP by The Dead Science under their original name 'The Sweet Science'.

Track listing
 "The Satin Glove"  – 5:35
 "Prefect"  – 4:21
 "Galactose"  – 3:47
 "Curtain"  – 2:31
 "I Don't Believe"  – 6:17
 "Endless Cities"  – 4:32
 "Tangle Eye"  – 3:31

Self-released EPs
1999 EPs
The Dead Science albums